Basting, Baste, or Basted may refer to:

 Baste, Palghar district, Maharashtra, India
 Basting (cooking), a cooking technique
 Basted, Kent, a hamlet in England
 A type of stitch in sewing

People
 Manuel Basté (1899–1977), Spanish water polo player
 Pierre Baste (1768–1814), French admiral and general
 Anne Basting, American gerontologist and professor
 Johan Hendrik Christiaan Basting (1817–1870), Dutch surgeon and military personnel
 Yvette Basting (born 1977), Dutch tennis player

See also
 Baster (disambiguation)